Kevin O'Brien may refer to:

Sportsmen
Kevin O'Brien (American football) (born 1970), American football player
Kevin O'Brien (Australian footballer) (1932–2020), Australian rules footballer
Kevin O'Brien (cricketer) (born 1984), Irish cricketer                   
Kevin O'Brien (Dublin Gaelic footballer) (born 1991), Gaelic footballer for Dublin    
Kevin O'Brien (rugby league) (born 1932), Australian rugby league footballer
Kevin O'Brien (rugby union) (born 1955), 1980s Ireland rugby union international
Kevin O'Brien (rugby union coach), Welsh rugby union coach
Kevin O'Brien (Wicklow Gaelic footballer), Irish Gaelic footballer

Politicians
Kevin O'Brien (Newfoundland and Labrador politician) (born 1956), Newfoundland and Labrador MHA
Kevin O'Brien (Nunavut politician) (born 1956), Nunavut and Northwest Territories MLA

Others
Kevin F. O'Brien, American Jesuit and academic administrator
Kevin O'Brien (architect) (born 1972), architect in Queensland
Kevin O'Brien (author), railroad inspector and novelist
Kevin O'Brien (director), American director and storyboard artist